Charoq (also Romanized as Chāroq and Chāreq; also known as Chārūq) is a village in Chaharduli Rural District, in the Central District of Asadabad County, Hamadan Province, Iran. At the 2006 census, its population was 219, in 59 families.

References 

Populated places in Asadabad County